The Bruno School Building was a historic school building a short way south of Arkansas Highway 9 in Bruno, Arkansas.  It was a single story Plain Traditional (vernacular) frame structure, with a gable roof and a front porch with gabled pediment.  Built in 1920, it had some Craftsman style influence, including exposed rafter tails and the square columns on stone piers which supported the porch.  It was a locally significant well-preserved example of a rural school building.

The building was listed on the National Register of Historic Places in 1992, and was delisted in 2017 after it was torn down.  The school complex includes other listed buildings, including Aggie Hall (the gymnasium), and the Aggie Workshop.

See also
 Aggie Hall: 1926 Bruno Agricultural School gymnasium
 Aggie Workshop: 1935 Bruno Agricultural School workshop
 Hirst-Mathew Hall: 1929 Bruno Agricultural School classrooms
 National Register of Historic Places listings in Marion County, Arkansas

References

School buildings on the National Register of Historic Places in Arkansas
National Register of Historic Places in Marion County, Arkansas
Former National Register of Historic Places in Arkansas
Demolished buildings and structures in Arkansas
Schools in Marion County, Arkansas
1920 establishments in Arkansas
American Craftsman architecture in Arkansas
School buildings completed in 1920